The 2016 Torneo Internacional Challenger León was a professional tennis tournament played on hard courts. It was the fourteenth edition of the tournament which was part of the 2016 ATP Challenger Tour. It took place in León, Mexico between 28 March and 3 April 2015.

Singles main-draw entrants

Seeds

 1 Rankings are as of March 21, 2016.

Other entrants
The following players received wildcards into the singles main draw:
  Lucas Gómez
  Hans Hach Verdugo
  Tigre Hank
  Alejandro Moreno Figueroa

The following players received entry from the qualifying draw:
  Emilio Gómez
  Robin Staněk
  Agustín Velotti
  Caio Zampieri

The following players received entry courtesy of a special exempt:
  Marcelo Arévalo
  Peđa Krstin

The following players received entry as alternates:
  Pedro Cachín
  Jason Jung
  Daniel Nguyen
  Mohamed Safwat
  João Souza

Champions

Singles

 Michael Berrer def.  João Souza, 6–3, 6–2

Doubles

 Santiago González /  Mate Pavić def.  Sam Groth /  Leander Paes, 6–4, 3–6, [13–11]

External links
Official Website

Torneo Internacional Challenger León
Torneo Internacional Challenger León
2016 in Mexican tennis